The Colombia men's national tennis team represents Colombia in the Davis Cup and is governed by the Federación Colombiana de Tenis.

Colombia currently competes in the David Cup Finals, formerly known as the World Group. In 2018, they have reached the Play-offs to the World Group for the sixth time.
For the first time in its history, Colombia advanced to the World Group, winning 4–0 to Sweden in the Play-off in 2019 Davis Cup.

History
Colombia competed in its first Davis Cup in 1959 Davis Cup.

Current team (2019)

 Daniel Elahi Galán
 Alejandro González
 Cristian Rodríguez
 Juan Sebastián Cabal
 Robert Farah
 Santiago Giraldo

Results

See also
Davis Cup
Colombia Fed Cup team

References

External links

Davis Cup teams
Davis Cup
Davis Cup